Altdorf is an unincorporated community in Wood County, in the U.S. state of Wisconsin.

History
A post office was established at Altdorf in 1885, and remained in operation until 1905.
 The community was named after Altdorf, in Switzerland, the native home of a share of the first settlers.

The community once had a schoolhouse, Altdorf School, now defunct.

References

Unincorporated communities in Wood County, Wisconsin
Unincorporated communities in Wisconsin